Kerim Frei Koyunlu (born 19 November 1993) is a footballer who plays as a winger for Fatih Karagümrük. Born in Austria, he represents the Turkish national team. He previously played club football for Fulham, Cardiff City, İstanbul Başakşehir, Beşiktaş, Birmingham City and Maccabi Haifa, and represented Switzerland up to under-21 level.

Early life
Frei was born in Feldkirch, Austria, to a Turkish father and a Moroccan mother and was raised in Switzerland.

Career

Fulham
Frei made his first team début on 7 July 2011 in Fulham's Europa League first qualifying round, second leg match against NSÍ Runavík of the Faroe Islands, where he came on as a substitute in the 72nd minute replacing Andrew Johnson. Following his debut, Huw Jennings gave his thoughts about Frei debut to Fulham.com:

Frei then went on to make his first start for Fulham, playing on the right wing in the Europa League second qualifying round, first leg match against Crusaders in Belfast on 14 July 2011, receiving a yellow card in the 62nd minute.

He made his first start in English competition in a League Cup third round fixture away to Chelsea on 21 September 2011 and made his Premier League début on 10 December 2011, coming on a substitute for Mousa Dembélé in an away match against Swansea City. Fulham lost the match 2–0. Frei scored his first senior goal for Fulham in the Europa League 2–2 draw against Odense BK at Craven Cottage, side footing home from a Dembélé through ball.

On 16 March 2012, Frei signed a contract extension with Fulham, lasting until the summer of 2015.
A week later, Frei started in Fulham's 1–0 defeat at Old Trafford against Manchester United. He was replaced by Bryan Ruiz in the 67th minute.

On 9 April 2012 in a 1–1 draw against Chelsea, Frei received the Man of the Match award from Sky Television for his performance.

On 26 October 2012, Frei joined Cardiff City on loan until 2 December. His first appearance was against Burnley, coming on in the 83rd minute for Craig Noone. On 22 November, Frei was recalled to Fulham after 3 appearances.

Beşiktaş

Frei joined Turkish club Beşiktaş on 6 September 2013, signing a five-year deal. He made his league debut on 22 September 2013 in a 3–0 loss to Galatasaray, coming on in the 80th minute for Veli Kavlak. He scored his first league goal for Besiktas over a year later in a 3–2 loss to Kayseri Erciyesspor. He scored a brace in this game, one goal in the 70th minute, the other in the 85th, coming after he had come on for an injured Olcay Şahan in the 37th minute.

Birmingham City

On 20 January 2017, Frei returned to English football, signing for Birmingham City on a three-and-a-half-year contract. The fee was an initial €2.25 million, potentially rising to €3.5M. He made his debut in the EFL Championship the following day, as an 82nd-minute substitute in a 1–1 draw away to Blackburn Rovers, but never established himself in the team. He finished the season with 13 league appearances, only 3 of which were in the starting eleven, and was an unused substitute 16 times. He scored once, with a  free kick away to Rotherham United on 14 April; Frei "stepped up and arrowed the ball straight and dipping beyond [Rotherham's goalkeeper]" to win the club's Goal of the Season award but not the match.

İstanbul Başakşehir
After just six months with Birmingham City, Frei returned to Turkey. He signed a four-year contract with İstanbul Başakşehir on 21 July 2017. He made his league debut for his new club on 19 August 2017 in a 3–1 loss to Kardemir Karabükspor.

He spent the second half of the 2018–19 season on loan at Maccabi Haifa, and after returning to his parent club but playing little, joined Dutch Eredivisie club Emmen in January 2020 on loan with an option to purchase.

International career
Frei switched national team allegiances from Switzerland to Turkey in June 2012. He represented Turkey at the 2013 FIFA U-20 World Cup.

Career statistics

Honours
Beşiktaş J.K.
Süper Lig: 2015–16

References

External links
 
 
 
 
 
 
 

1993 births
Living people
People from Feldkirch, Vorarlberg
Swiss men's footballers
Turkish footballers
Citizens of Turkey through descent
Austrian emigrants to Switzerland
Switzerland youth international footballers
Switzerland under-21 international footballers
Turkey youth international footballers
Turkey under-21 international footballers
Turkey international footballers
Association football midfielders
Fulham F.C. players
Cardiff City F.C. players
Beşiktaş J.K. footballers
Birmingham City F.C. players
İstanbul Başakşehir F.K. players
Maccabi Haifa F.C. players
FC Emmen players
Fatih Karagümrük S.K. footballers
Premier League players
English Football League players
Süper Lig players
Israeli Premier League players
Eredivisie players
Turkish expatriate footballers
Expatriate footballers in England
Expatriate footballers in Israel
Expatriate footballers in the Netherlands
Turkish expatriate sportspeople in England
Turkish expatriate sportspeople in Israel
Turkish expatriate sportspeople in the Netherlands
Swiss people of Turkish descent
Swiss people of Moroccan descent
Turkish people of Moroccan descent